Daniel Hardy (born December 15, 1998) is an American football linebacker for the Los Angeles Rams of the National Football League (NFL). He played college football at the College of the Siskiyous and  Montana State.

Professional career
Hardy was selected in the seventh round of the 2022 NFL Draft by the Los Angeles Rams. He was placed on injured reserve on September 1, 2022. He was designated to return from injured reserve on November 30, 2022. He was activated from injured reserve three days later.

References

External links
 Los Angeles Rams bio
 College of the Siskiyous Eagles bio
 Montana State Bobcats bio

1998 births
Living people
Players of American football from Oregon
Sportspeople from Beaverton, Oregon
American football linebackers
Montana State Bobcats football players
Los Angeles Rams players